John Renzie Bogart (September 21, 1900 – December 7, 1986), nicknamed "Big John", was a Major League Baseball (MLB) pitcher who played for the Detroit Tigers in 1920.

External links

1900 births
1986 deaths
Detroit Tigers players
Major League Baseball pitchers
Baseball players from Pennsylvania